Diplotaxis gorgadensis is a species of flowering plants of the family Brassicaceae. The species is endemic to Cape Verde. It is listed as an endangered plant by the IUCN.

Distribution and ecology
Diplotaxis gorgadensis is restricted to the island of Santo Antão, where it occurs in the northeastern part of the island, between 450 and 1,300 metres elevation. It is more frequent in humid mountain zones, but is also found in sub-humid and semi-arid zones.

Subspecies
Two subspecies are recognised:
Diplotaxis gorgadensis subsp. brochmannii
Diplotaxis gorgadensis subsp. gorgadensis

References

gorgadensis
Endemic flora of Cape Verde
Flora of Santo Antão, Cape Verde